Michael Tawiah (born 1 December 1990) is a Ghanaian professional footballer who plays as a midfielder.

Career
Born in Accra, Tawiah starter playing at the age of 12 at Ambah FC and then he played with Tema.  Then he continued his career in Bulgaria with Lokomotiv Mezdra, Levski Sofia and Kaliakra Kavarna.

In July 2011, Tawiah joined Chernomorets Burgas after his contract with Levski Sofia was mutually terminated.  In September 2011, he was released due to health problems. After that Tawiah played in Bulgarian clubs PFC Lyubimets and PFC Haskovo.

On 29 January 2015, Tawiah signed with Serbian Superliga club Borac Čačak.

On 30 January 2017, Tawiah was released by Pomorie.  In March 2017, he joined Japanese club Vonds Ichihara.

References

External links
 
 Michael Tawiah at Srbijafudbal

1990 births
Living people
Footballers from Accra
Ghanaian footballers
Association football midfielders
Ghanaian expatriate footballers
PFC Lokomotiv Mezdra players
PFC Levski Sofia players
PFC Kaliakra Kavarna players
FC Lyubimets players
FC Haskovo players
FK Borac Čačak players
FC Pomorie players
Vonds Ichihara players
FC Vereya players
First Professional Football League (Bulgaria) players
Expatriate footballers in Bulgaria
Ghanaian expatriate sportspeople in Bulgaria
Serbian SuperLiga players
Expatriate footballers in Serbia
Ghanaian expatriate sportspeople in Serbia
Expatriate footballers in Japan